The House of Montagu (historically Montagud, Montaigu, Montague, Montacute and Latinised as de Monte Acuto ("from the sharp mountain" (French: "mont aigu")) is an English noble family founded in Somerset after the Norman Conquest of 1066 by the Norman warrior Drogo de Montagud (so named in the Domesday Book). They rose to their highest power and prominence in the 14th and 15th centuries as Earls of Salisbury, the last in the male line being Thomas Montagu, 4th Earl of Salisbury (1388-1428), the maternal grandfather of "Warwick the King-Maker", 16th Earl of Warwick, 6th Earl of Salisbury.  

The surviving noble family of Montagu "of Boughton" in Northamptonshire, where in 1683 the 1st Duke of Montagu built the splendid and surviving Boughton House, claimed descent from the ancient Anglo-Norman family of Montagu, Earls of Salisbury, which connection is however unproven. The earliest proven ancestor of the Montagu family of Boughton is Thomas Montagu (d.1516) of Hemington, Northamptonshire, the son of Richard Ladde (d.1484), "alias Montagu", of Hanging Houghton in Northamptonshire, whose family of Ladde is recorded in the deeds of that place from 1355. Richard Ladde "alias Montagu" was the father of Sir Edward Montagu, Lord Chief Justice (great-great grandfather of the 1st Duke), who purchased the estate of Boughton in 1528. It is suggested by the Complete Peerage that the Ladde family adopted the surname of Montagu due to "having to deal with some Montagu inheritance", i.e. dictated by the terms of a bequest from a member of that family, as was common practice, requiring the legatee to adopt the surname and arms of the legator, where a branch of a family had died out in the male line. Collins Peerage suggests that the Montagu family of Boughton was descended from James "Montagu", a natural son of Thomas Montagu, 4th Earl of Salisbury (1388-1428), the maternal grandfather of "Warwick the King-Maker", 16th Earl of Warwick, 6th Earl of Salisbury. The Montagu family of Boughton and its descendants use the coat of arms of Montagu, Earls of Salisbury, but differenced by a bordure sable, and quarters the arms of Monthermer, as did the Earls of Salisbury, but undifferenced.

Sir Edward Montagu of Boughton, Lord Chief Justice, was the ancestor of Montagu, Duke of Montagu, Montagu, Earls and Dukes of Manchester, Montagu, Earls of Sandwich and Montagu, Earls of Halifax, as well as the extant Montagu Baronies of Kimbolton, St Neots and Beaulieu. The head of the family is the Duke of Manchester.

Drogo de Montagud
The founder of the English family of Montagu was "Drogo de Montagud", as his name appeared in its Latinised form in the Domesday Book of 1086. From his pattern of landholdings he appears to have been a knight or follower of Robert, Count of Mortain, the half-brother of King William the Conqueror. Most of his sixteen English estates listed in the Domesday Book were held from Robert, Count of Mortain as his feudal overlord, with only one held directly from the king, namely Knowle. His principal landholdings were in the Hundred of Wincanton in Somerset, near Bruton Priory where some of the early family were buried. His Domesday Book holdings included:

Held in-chief

Knowle
Chenolle (Knowle) (in the Hundred of Wincanton), held in-chief from the crown. In the Domesday Book entry for Chenolle he is called "Drogo de Montagud". The ancient estate is situated between the villages of Shepton Montagu and Stoney Stoke, on the east side of a knoll or hill, now represented by Knowle Park Farm, 1.5 km east of Shepton Montagu Church, and by Knowle Rock Farm, 0.8 km further east. Grants of free warren were obtained for Knowle in 1314 and 1317 and a deer park was in existence in 1397, which in 1569  was a mile "in compass". It was retained by the Montagu family until the extinction of the senior male line on the death of Thomas Montagu, 4th Earl of Salisbury (1388-1428) when it passed through his daughter to the Neville family.

Held from Robert, Count of Mortain

Shepton Montague
Sceptone (now Shepton Montague) (in the Hundred of Wincanton), held from Robert, Count of Mortain. He is named simply as "Drogo" in the Domesday Book entry.

Stony Stoke
Stoche (now Stoney Stoke) (in the Hundred of Wincanton). It was an addition to the manor of Sceptone, thus also held from Robert, Count of Mortain. He is named simply as "Drogo" in the Domesday Book entry.

Bishopstone

Biscopestone in the hundred of Tintinhull, Somerset. Now Bishopstone, the site of Montacute Priory within the village of Montacute, and to the immediate north of the Priory the Elizabethan mansion Montacute House. In this manor Robert, Count of Mortain "has his castle, which is called "Montagud" (Ipse Comes (Moriton) tenet in dominio Biscopestone et ibi est castellum eius quod vocatur Montagud The summit of the Iron Age hill fort of Ham Hill (or St Michael's Hill), a fort of the Durotriges tribe, is situated 620 metres south-west of the present Montacute House. It became known at some time before 1086 by the Latin name of Mons Acutus, meaning "Sharp Mountain", being referred to in the Domesday Book "Montagud". One of the Count's four tenants at Biscopestone is named in the Domesday Book as "Drogo", who held one hide, believed to be the "Drogo de Montagud", the tenant of Chenolle (Knowle). This has added some mystery to the origin of the surname "de Montagu". It is stated in some sources that the English de Montagu family, Earls of Salisbury, took its surname from its supposed manor of origin in Normandy, said to be Montaigu-les-Bois, in the arrondissement of Coutances, which remained in the possession of a French family called "de Montaigu" until the death of Sebastien de Montaigu in 1715, without children.  According to the Duchess of Cleveland (Battle Abbey Roll, 1889): "(Drogo de Montaigu) had come to England in the train of the Earl of Mortain, and received from him large grants of lands, with the custody of the castle, built either by the Earl or his son William, in the manor of Bishopston, and styled, from its position on a sharp-topped hill, Monte Acuto" (sic, Mons Acutus). The French spelling "Mont-Aigu" means "sharp mountain", and the family's name was Latinised as de Monte Acuto (ablative form of Mons Acutus - "from the Sharp Mountain"). Authorities are not agreed as to whether the family was named after the hill in Bishopton, or whether the hill, village, parish and priory, were named after the family, thus ultimately after Montaigu-les-Bois in Normandy.

Tintinhull
Tintehalle (Tintinhull), in the Hundred of Tintinhull, situated 1.5 miles north of Bishopstone.

Thorne
Torne (Thorne), in the hundred of Stone, Somerset, situated 3.4 km east of Bishopstone. Held from Robert, Count of Mortain. At some time before 1160 Drogo donated land at Thorne and at Bishopstone to Montacute Priory and made grants to Bruton Priory, where he was buried.

Titles of the Montagu family

Montagu
Baron Montagu; first creation (1299; extinct 1539)
Earl of Salisbury; second creation (1337; extinct or abeyant 1471)
Baron Montagu; second creation (1342; extinct 1375)
Baron Montagu; third creation (1357; extinct 1539)

Ladde-Montagu
For titles conferred on the Ladde "alias Montagu" family, descended from Sir Edward Montagu (1485-1557) of Boughton, Lord Chief Justice, see :

Duke of Manchester
Baron Montagu of Kimbolton (1620; extant) a subsidiary title of the Duke of Manchester
Viscount Mandeville (1620; extant) a subsidiary title of the Duke of Manchester
Earl of Manchester (1626 ; extant) a subsidiary title of the Duke of Manchester
Duke of Manchester (1719 ; extant)

Duke of Montagu (First Creation)
Baron Montagu of Boughton (1621; extinct 1749) a subsidiary title of the Earl, then Duke of Montagu
Earl of Montagu (1689; extinct 1749) a subsidiary title of the Duke of Montagu
Duke of Montagu; First Creation (1705; extinct 1749)

Earl of Sandwich
Baron Montagu of St Neots (1660; extant) a subsidiary title of the Earl of Sandwich
Viscount Hinchingbrooke (1660; extant) a subsidiary title of the Earl of Sandwich
Earl of Sandwich

Brudenell-Montagu
For titles conferred on the family of Brudenell, Earl of Cardigan, descendants via a female line, who adopted the name and arms of Montagu, see :
Baron Montagu of Boughton; first creation (1762; extinct 1770)
Duke of Montagu; second creation (1766; extinct 1790)
Baron Montagu of Boughton; second creation (1786; extinct 1845). This title passed on the family of Scott.

Douglas-Scott-Montagu
Title conferred on the family of Douglas-Scott-Montagu, descendants via a female line of the Brudenell-Montagu line : 
Baron Montagu of Beaulieu (1885; extant)

Browne-Montagu
Title conferred on the line of Browne, maternal descendants who retook the name and arms of Montagu, see :
Viscount Montagu (1554; dormant 1797)

References

 
Noble families of the United Kingdom